The Evangelical and Ecumenical Women's Caucus (EEWC), also known as Christian Feminism Today (CFT), is a group of evangelical Christian feminists founded in 1974. It was originally named the Evangelical Women's Caucus (EWC) because it began as a caucus within Evangelicals for Social Action, which had issued the "Chicago Declaration". Its mission is to "support, educate, and celebrate Christian feminists from many traditions." It favored passage of the Equal Rights Amendment, encourages the ordination of women, and has called for gender-inclusive language in all communications. The word ecumenical was added to the organization's name in 1990 in order "to reflect the increasingly inclusive nature and the many traditions of [the organization's] membership".

In 1986 EWC passed a resolution by a two-to-one margin stating:

This resolution led Catherine Kroeger and other more conservative members to form Christians for Biblical Equality.

See also 
Christian egalitarianism
Homosexuality and Christianity
HerChurch

References

Footnotes

Bibliography

External links 
 

Christian advocacy groups
Christian organizations based in the United States
Christian women's organizations
Christianity and society in the United States
Evangelical organizations established in the 20th century
Evangelicalism in the United States
Feminist organizations in the United States
Protestant feminism
Christian organizations established in 1974
1974 establishments in the United States